Atlas Air Worldwide Holdings is an airline holding company based in Purchase, New York. The group owns Atlas Air, Polar Air Cargo, and has a freighter aircraft leasing joint venture with Bain Capital: Titan Aircraft Investments.

The company was named after Atlas, a figure in Greek mythology, who carries the sky on his shoulders.

Operations 

Atlas Air Worldwide Holdings owns Atlas Air, Polar Air Cargo, and Titan Aircraft Investments. The company headquarters are in Purchase, New York.

Atlas Air operates flights on an ACMI (Aircraft, Crew, Maintenance and Insurance), CMI and air charter basis for airlines, express operators, freight forwarders, charter brokers, global shippers and the U.S. Military, along with dry-leasing freighter aircraft. Atlas Air has global operations established in Africa, Asia, the Pacific, Europe, the Middle East, North America, and South America.

Titan Aircraft Investments, is an aircraft dry-leasing company. Titan owns 29 aircraft in its dry-leasing fleet. The dry-leasing fleet consists of seven Boeing 777 freighters, twenty-one Boeing 767 freighters (leased to parent Atlas Air), and one Boeing 737-300 freighter.

Fleet 
, Atlas Air operates the following aircraft:

See also 
 List of S&P 600 companies

References

External links 

 

American companies established in 1992
Charter airlines of the United States
Airlines established in 1992
Airlines for America members
Cargo airlines of the United States
Companies based in Purchase, New York
Companies listed on the Nasdaq
1992 establishments in New York (state)
Airlines based in New York (state)
1995 initial public offerings
Companies that filed for Chapter 11 bankruptcy in 2004